Michael K. Nagata is a retired U.S. Army lieutenant general.

Early career
Nagata was commissioned as a Second lieutenant in 1982 and served as an infantry platoon leader with the 1st Battalion, 9th Infantry Division in South Korea. He graduated from the Special Forces Qualification Course in 1984 and commanded a ODA detachment of the 2nd Battalion, 1st Special Forces Group where he gained a "reputation for coolness under pressure, and for a wry sense of humor."

In the decision that shaped his career, Nagata volunteered and was selected for the Intelligence Support Activity in 1990, nicknamed "The Activity", an ultra-secret unit conducting signal and human intelligence gathering for special mission units of Joint Special Operations Command. Nagata spent 15 years in the unit, serving as troop commander until 1994, and operations officer from 1997 to 1999. He would later serve as squadron commander from 2000-2002 and later unit commander as a Colonel from 2005 to 2008.

In 1993 while deployed on his first tour with The Activity in Somalia, Nagata was "the CIA chief of station’s right-hand man" according to Jerry Boykin (former commander of Delta Force) in Somalia, "functioning as the liaison between the chief of station in Mogadishu and Task Force Ranger, the Joint Special Operations Command (JSOC) task force given the mission to hunt down the warlord Mohamed Farrah Aidid."

Special Operations Command

From June 2013 to October 2015 Nagata commanded the Special Operations Command Central. Nagata was in charge of an Obama administration program to "train and equip Syrian rebels," but the program was deemed a "failure," and Nagata stepped down as commander of American Special Operations forces in the Middle East. The program "ultimately produced only a few dozen fighters," rather than the 15,000 originally hoped for.

Nagata's last position on active duty was the Director of Strategy for the National Counterterrorism Center (NCTC) from 2016 to 2019.

Post Army career
On January 6, 2020, CACI International Inc. announced that it had "named Lt. Gen. Michael Nagata, U.S. Army (Ret.), as Corporate Strategic Advisor and Senior Vice President to enhance the positioning of CACI’s national security-related expertise and technology offerings."

Awards and decorations

Personal life
Nagata and his wife Barbara have five children. He was born in Alexandria, Virginia to Frances and William Nagata, both from Honolulu, Hawaii. His father is a retired military intelligence colonel and was stationed in Virginia at the time of Michael's birth.

References

External links
SEÁN D. NAYLOR: Meet the Shadow Warrior Leading the Fight Against the Islamic State - Foreign Policy, 2015-05-01

See also

1954 births
Living people
United States Army generals
American military personnel of Japanese descent
Recipients of the Defense Distinguished Service Medal
Recipients of the Defense Superior Service Medal
Recipients of the Legion of Merit